Adventure Play at the Parish School is an adventure playground located in Houston, Texas.  The Adventure Playground at The Parish School consists of a three-acre play-area open to children between the ages of 6 and 12 years old.  It is one of the few junk playgrounds located in the United States, and the only one located in a school.  The playground serves children with communication disorders and language and learning differences, often including difficulties interacting with peers.

Adventure playground
The Adventure playground at the Parish School was started in 2008 with a sand-pile and two cement culverts.  The three-acre play-area now contains a zip-line, shade structures, and an expanse of grassy floodplain, with natural features (dirt, grass, sticks), wildlife, and various scavenged construction materials, other recyclables, lumber, pipes, fabric and rope.  Children also have access to tools (hammers and nails, hand drills and saws, shovels and post-hole diggers) for building structures out of recycled building materials.  Many of these materials are collected from the Building Materials Reuse Warehouse, a part of the City of Houston's Solid Waste Management Department.

The Adventure Playground at the Parish School is staffed by playworkers.

Research site
The Adventure Playground at the Parish School has been the site of several academic studies.  These have concerned landscape design and comparisons of injury rates between conventional adult-designed-and-built playgrounds and child-designed-and-built junk playgrounds, or risky playgrounds.  For example, comparing injury rates between two playground types, Wood and Leichter-Saxby (2016) found that the location with the fewest incidents was the child-built adventure playground.  In a statistical study of risky play at the Parish School, which compared injury rates there to other activities, Leichter-Saxby and Wood (2018) found that play on the school's adventure playground was slightly riskier than snooker and safer than table tennis.  Playing on conventional fixed equipment at school recess was riskier than golf, but safer than being at home.  Adventure play was safer than play on conventional playground equipment, but each carried an extremely low risk of serious injury.

Notes

References

External links
Adventure play at the Parish School
Tour of The Parish School's Adventure Playground with Jill Wood in Houston, Texas.

Adventure playgrounds
Parks in Houston